Glen Ellis Friedman (born March 3, 1962) is an American photographer and artist. He became known for his activities within rebellious skateboarding and music cultures. Photographing artists Fugazi, Black Flag, Dead Kennedys, Circle Jerks, Minor Threat, Misfits, Bad Brains, Beastie Boys, Suicidal Tendencies, Slayer, Run-DMC, KRS-One, and Public Enemy, as well as classic skateboarding originators Tony Alva, Jay Adams, Alan Gelfand, Duane Peters, and Stacy Peralta, among others.

Friedman's photography has been published in eight of his books as well as in other publications, including record covers, and has been exhibited in art galleries and museums. His work is held in various photography collections including the Metropolitan Museum of Art in New York City.

Early life
As a pre-teen Friedman rode skateboards in the embanked schoolyards of West Los Angeles along with others who would revolutionize the activity. In late 1976, while he was still in junior high school, Friedman corralled some of his friends, who were beginning to be featured in magazines, into riding in an empty swimming pool so he could make pictures. He showed the results to a freelance SkateBoarder writer, who put Friedman in touch with the editor. SkateBoarder published photographs by Friedman as a full-page subscription advertisement. He soon after became their youngest staff member.

Career 
Several years later Friedman began to photograph at punk shows. Black Flag received some of their first media documentation through Friedman's work. In 1981, he photographed his first record album cover, Adolescents by Adolescents. As well as many other punk record covers including Minor Threat's Salad Days EP. Friedman's self-published punk zine, My Rules: Photozine (1982), sold 10,000 copies and was the largest selling zine of the era.

Friedman managed punk band Suicidal Tendencies and in 1983 produced their eponymous debut album.

In 1985, Friedman was introduced to Rick Rubin and Russell Simmons, after creating some memorable Beastie Boys photos, before they were widely known. Friedman began working with them and their newly formed Def Jam Records, promoting Beastie Boys, LL Cool J, Public Enemy, Ice-T and Run-DMC. He also photographed many of their album covers and publicity materials, including the covers of Public Enemy's It Takes a Nation of Millions to Hold Us Back, and  Beastie Boys' Check Your Head. Many of his photographs have become recognized as the subjects' definitive portraits. In 1987 he relocated back to New York.

Friedman has collaborated with artist Shepard Fairey, many times, including limited edition prints based on Friedman's photographs.

In 2004, Friedman created the "Liberty Street Protest" at Ground Zero in New York City. Its provocative anti-war sentiment received attention internationally. It was "re-visited" in 2010 in support of Freedom of Religion, and the placement of a mosque a few blocks away from Ground Zero in New York City.

In 2012, Friedman was inducted as an "Icon" into the Skateboarding Hall of Fame.

Personal life
Friedman is a progressive political activist, shuns intoxicants (straight edge), and follows a vegan diet. He lives in New York City.

Publications by Friedman
Glen E. Friedman. My Rules: Photozine (self-published, 1982).
Glen E. Friedman, with an introduction by C.R. Stecyk III. Fuck You Heroes: Glen E. Friedman photographs 1976–1991 (self-published / Burning Flags Press, 1994). . A collection of his better-known photographs of skateboarding, punk, and hip hop subcultures spanning 1976 to 1991.
Glen E. Friedman with commentary by C.R. Stecyk III and an afterword by Sam Sifton. Fuck You Too: The Extras + More Scrapbook (ConSafos Press, 1996). Second edition 2005. .
The Idealist
Glen E. Friedman. The Idealist: Glen E. Friedman – In My Eyes – 20 Years (ConSafos Press, 1998). .
Glen E. Friedman. The Idealist: Glen E. Friedman – In My Eyes – 25 Years (1976–2001) (self-published / Burning Flags Press, 2003). .
C.R. Stecyk III and Glen E. Friedman. Dogtown: The Legend of the Z-Boys (self-published / Burning Flags Press, 2000). .
Glen E. Friedman with a preface by Peter Lamborn Wilson. Recognize (self-published / Burning Flags Press, 2005). .
Glen E. Friedman. Keep Your Eyes Open: The Fugazi Photographs of Glen E. Friedman (self-published / Burning Flags Press, 2007). .
Glen E. Friedman. My Rules (Rizzoli, 2014). . A different publication than the 1982 publication of the same name.
C.R. Stecyk III and Glen E. Friedman. Dogtown: The Legend of the Z-Boys - Expanded edition (Akashic Books / Burning Flags Press, 2019). . 
Glen E. Friedman with an introduction by Ivan F. Svenonius. Keep Your Eyes Open: The Fugazi Photographs of Glen E. Friedman (Akashic Books / Burning Flags Press, 2019). Expanded second edition .`
Glen E. Friedman with an introduction by Chris Rock. Together Forever: The Run-DMC and Beastie Boys Photographs of Glen E. Friedman. (Rizzoli, 2019).

Films with contributions by Friedman
Dogtown and Z-Boys (2001). Co-producer and creative consultant
No No: A Dockumentary (2014). Associate producer and creative consultant.
Saving Banksy (2017). Himself.
Obey Giant (2017). Himself.

Major solo exhibitions
Fuck You All, Institute of Contemporary Arts, London, 1997; Sydney, 1998; Tokyo, 1998; Rome, 1998; Florence, 1998; Milan, 1998; Berlin, 1999; Stockholm, 1999; Chicago, 1999; Washington, D.C., 2000; Philadelphia, 2000; Stockholm, 2000; Los Angeles, 2002; Antwerp, Belgium, 2007; Krakow, Poland, 2009; Dublin, 2010; San Francisco, 2010; Canary Islands, Spain, 2014.
The Idealist, Los Angeles, 2004
Idealist Propaganda, Subliminal Projects, Los Angeles, 2008  Retrospective exhibition.
My Rules, ATP Gallery at 14 Henrietta St, London, November 21, 2014 – January 18, 2015.

Collections
Friedman's work is held in the following public collections:
Metropolitan Museum of Art, New York, New York.
Berkeley Art Museum and Pacific Film Archive, Berkeley, California.
Smithsonian Institution, Photographic History Collection, National Museum of American History. Washington D.C.
Museum of Fine Arts Houston, Houston, Texas.
Morgan Library and Museum, New York, New York.
Stanford University, Stanford, California.
New York Public Library, New York, New York.
University of California Los Angeles, Los Angeles, California.
Emory University, Atlanta, Georgia.
Cornell University, Ithaca, New York.
Wolfsonian-FIU, Miami Beach, Florida.
W.E.B. Du Bois Institute for African and African American Research, Cambridge, Massachusetts.

Quotes about Friedman

"The bottom line is that he was there at the beginning of so much cool stuff in so many different areas it's not funny." – Henry Rollins
Friedman says about his work, "For me it's about inspiring people, with integrity and rebelliousness." To which, Keith Hamm of the Los Angeles Times said, "For the past quarter century, Friedman has been doing just that." – Keith Hamm, Los Angeles Times.
"The most prolific photographer of his generation." – American Institute of Graphic Arts
"The esoteric political and aesthetic conscience of his generation." – Juxtapoz Art & Culture Magazine
 "His [cloud] photos achieve what so many others only aspire to—they show the spiritual within the physical." – Adam Beinash, LA Weekly
"Outspoken, individual, and the very best at what he does...It's time Friedman was listed alongside Capa, Bresson, and Avedon." - Candy Culture

References

External links 
 Burning Flags site dedicated to Glen E. Friedman's Archive and latest information.
 Friedman Video Interview before exhibit in San Francisco, CA 2010
 Friedman Video Interview with State Radio On-Line in Dublin, Ireland 2010
 Friedman Video Interview  on ARTE TV Pt. 1 of 3 Capturing Culture series, France 2016
 Friedman Video Interview on ARTE TV Pt. 2 of 3 Capturing Culture series, France 2016
 Friedman Video Interview on ARTE TV Pt. 3 of 3 Capturing Culture series, France 2016
 

1962 births
American photographers
People from North Carolina
Living people
Skate photographers